Nerine sarniensis, commonly known as Guernsey lily is a species of flowering plant in the family Amaryllidaceae. It is the type species of the Nerine genus. It is widely cultivated in the temperate world and is particularly associated with the island of Guernsey, as reflected in both its Latin and common names (sarniensis means "from Guernsey"), though it does not originate there, nor is it a true lily (it is more closely related to Amaryllis and Sternbergia). It is native to the Northern and Western Cape Provinces of South Africa, though it is now naturalized in France, Madeira and the Azores.

In cultivation N. sarniensis requires winter protection in colder areas. Nerine lily is known among florists as one of the longest lasting cut flowers.

See also

 List of plants known as lily

References

Bibliography

External links
 

Amaryllidoideae
Flora of the Cape Provinces
Garden plants
Plants described in 1753
Taxa named by Carl Linnaeus
National symbols of Guernsey